"Butterfly" is a song recorded by American singer-songwriter, and record producer Mariah Carey for her sixth studio album of the same name (1997). It was released on September 29, 1997, by Columbia Records as the second single from the album. The song was written and produced by Carey and Walter Afanasieff. "Butterfly" is a  pop and R&B ballad combining elements of gospel. Carey had originally conceived it as a house record with David Morales titled "Fly Away" (Butterfly Reprise). After realizing how personal the lyrics were and how they could be applied to Butterfly, she wrote the album's title track with Afanasieff. On the song's lyrics, Carey sings to someone, telling them to spread their wings and release into the world on their own, like a butterfly.

The accompanying music video for "Butterfly" depicts Carey in an abandoned house, trapped in a desolate life. As the video progresses, she leaves, apparently for the first time in years, and runs into a nearby meadow. Towards the end, Carey jumps over a barbed fence and goes out into the world on a horse. The song's lyrics and video were directly connected to Carey's personal life at the time. "Butterfly" was performed live on the Late Show with David Letterman, Saturday Night Live, and various European television programs. The song was also a permanent part of the set-list during her Butterfly World Tour during 1998. Due to current conflict with Columbia, "Butterfly" was never issued a commercial release, therefore hindering its charting ability. The single performed weakly on the charts, peaking outside the top 20 in most countries, except for New Zealand, where it peaked at number 15. The song also reached the top-ten in Croatia and Taiwan. In 2003, Q Magazine ranked "Butterfly" at number 563 in their list of the "1001 Best Songs Ever".

Background 
During the recording for Butterfly, Carey was in the midst of her separation from then husband, Tommy Mottola. While writing the material for the album, she wrote a house music record titled "Fly Away (Butterfly Reprise)" with David Morales. When the song was finished, Carey felt there was something more she could do with the song; the lyrics were very personal and a perfect fit for a ballad. After contemplating on the matter, Carey re-wrote "Fly Away" in ballad form, and incorporated new lyrics and vocals.
It was '97 and I was leaving my marriage [to Tommy Mottola]. which encompassed my life. I was writing the song 'Butterfly' wishing that that's what he would say to me. There's a part that goes, 'I have learned that beauty / has to flourish in the light / wild horses run unbridled / or their spirit dies / you have given me the courage / to be all that I can / and I truly feel ...[sings] and I truly feel your heart will lead you back to me when you're ready to land.' At that point I really believed that I was going to go back to the marriage – I didn't think I was going to leave forever. But then the things that happened to me during that time caused me to not go back. Had it been, 'Go be yourself, you've been with me since you were a kid, let's separate for a while,' I probably would've.
The song was named "Butterfly" and became Carey's "favorite and most heartfelt ballad." Its lyrics were very personal, linking to Carey's personal life and relationship with Mottola. Carey wrote "Butterfly" for Mottola, hoping he would say its contents to her, and choose to do what was best for her. She described the song as "the best ballad she had ever written" and credited it as the epitome of her magnum opus, which was Butterfly.

Composition 

"Butterfly" is a personal ballad, which blends pop, R&B, gospel and soul genres. It incorporates piano and drum notes, including heavy beats and grooves. As part of "layering the song," background vocals are featured throughout the chorus and sections of the bridge. It is set in the signature common time, and is written in the key of A major. It features a basic chord progression of A-F-1. Carey's vocal range in the song spans from the note of G3 to the high note of A6; the piano and guitar pieces range from A3 to A5. The song contains choral lyrics written by Carey, who produced the song's melody and chorus as well. Aside from assisting with its writing and chord progression, Afanasieff co-arranged and produced the track as well. In his review for the album, David Browne commented on the song's lyrics and message "The title song, a slice of florid pop gospel, explores the old if-you-love-someone-set-her-free theme; It isn't a reach to interpret these songs as describing life with the reportedly controlling Mottola.

Chart performance 
"Butterfly" was a moderate success on the charts, performing weakly in many music markets. In the United States, the song charted on the Hot 100 Airplay, peaking at number 16. In Canada, the song entered the RPM Singles Chart at number 57 on the RPM issue dated November 3, 1997, and reached its peak of number 22 on December 1, 1997. It was present on the chart for a total of 14 weeks.

The song's success in Europe was very limited as well, due to its non-commercial release. In the United Kingdom, the song entered the singles chart at its peak of 22, the week of December 13, 1997. "Butterfly" stayed in the chart for six weeks, falling out of the chart the week of January 17, 1998. In France and The Netherlands, the song peaked at number 43 and 52, respectively. In Australia, "Butterfly" cracked the top-40, peaking at number 27 and spending a total of ten weeks on the chart. "Butterfly" charted at number 15 in New Zealand, spending seven weeks on the chart. "Butterfly" was nominated for the 1998 Grammy Award for Best Female Pop Vocal Performance, which it lost to Sarah McLachlan's "Building a Mystery."

Critical reception 
Paul Verna from Billboard gave the song a positive review, writing "the lovely 'Butterfly' is classic Carey, from its gospel-kissed ballad instrumentation and choir chants to the diva's soaring, glass-shattering performance." Verna concluded, "This should not imply, however, that she is covering crusty old ground. The notable maturity in her lyrics and worldly warmth of her vocal reflect the growth that she has continually strived to attain." British magazine Music Week gave it four out of five, adding, "This is as smooth as any of her ballads, but it's in the vocals where the difference lies. No longer over-singing for the sake of it, Carey has rarely sounded more stunning." Rick Juzwiak from Slant Magazine gave the song a mixed review, but felt it was a pivotal part of Carey's vocal and musical transition. Juzwiak wrote "The agonizingly slow 'Butterfly,' with its predictably soaring chorus and if-it-comes-back-it-was-meant-to-be message, would have been ignorable tripe. Here, it's a show for the peeping. Echoes of her newly failed relationship with Mottola bounce off the gospelly song's cheap stained glass and then garble so that it sounds like some insane document of Stockholm Syndrome." He felt however, that the song was an important part of the album, "It isn't just subject matter that elevates 'Butterfly' above Carey's usual melodrama. Carey's vocal delivery and her willingness to experiment with it helped define the album, so it's only appropriate that its title track is the first of many to showcase Carey's much-debated 'whisper voice.'" Ian Hyland from Sunday Mirror gave it eight out of ten, commenting, "Flouncing around in sexy beige slips apart, ballads are what Mariah does best. And I'm more than happy to report she's still doing fine on both counts." Richard Harrington from The Washington Post complimented "Butterfly" as "a lush pop ballad that frames Carey's voice quite effectively".

Music video 
The single's accompanying music video was co-directed by Carey and Daniel Pearl. It was inspired by the Tennessee Williams play Baby Doll and a dream Carey had one night. The video begins with scenes of a man leaving his home one early morning; only his feet are shown. Carey is first seen residing in the derelict house, in the middle of a large meadow. She awakes, sad and depressed, wearing battered and disheveled clothing. As she walks down the stairs, Carey sits on the staircase, lamenting in agony at her loneliness. As the video climaxes, Carey is seen finally leaving the foyer, apparently for the first time in many years, escaping from the misery she once called home. As she reaches the outskirts of the property, Carey mounts a horse, which assists her in jumping over the barbed fence. After leaving, Carey is seen smiling for the first time in the video, while waving her arms in the air.

The video drew many comparisons to the rumors of Carey's deteriorating marriage at the time. Author Chris Nickson felt the video, like the song, served as a metaphor for the things that were taking place in her life at the time. Rumors circulated that Mottola was controlling, abusive and would even monitor Carey's phone calls. For this reason, she is portrayed with tattered clothing and hair in the video, with the final moments showing her escape. It features Carey finally leaving the lonely and abusive marriage she once was part of, and finally breaking free into the outside world. Unlike the video, the lyrics spoke of setting your loved one free, because it is the best thing for them; showing that their love for the person should be greater than their own happiness.

The music video for "Butterfly" was published on Carey's official YouTube channel in November 2009. It has amassed more than 37 million views as of September 2022.

Live performances 

Carey performed "Butterfly" on various American and European television programs. In the US, Carey first performed the song live on the Late Show with David Letterman, prior to an interview. Carey wore a mid-length black gown for the performance, and was accompanied by three back-up singers, Walter Afanasieff on piano and Randy Jackson playing the bass. On September 12, Carey sang "Butterfly" live on The Oprah Winfrey Show alongside her previous hit, "Hero." For her appearance, Carey wore a short blue skirt, and featured an array of gospel back-up singers. On November 15, Carey performed the song live on Saturday Night Live, alongside "My All." The performance featured the same musicians on set, with the exception of Afanasieff, who was absent.  In Europe, Carey performed the song on the popular German game show, Wetten, dass..?, featured only three female back-up singers. In France, Carey visited the talk show, "The Hit Machine," where she performed the song as well. After completing the song, Carey received a standing ovation.

The song was sung during her Butterfly World Tour in 1998, a part of the set list of every show. For the performances in Japan, Carey donned a long flowing gown, and featured live back-up. During the performance, large images of butterflies were projected onto the large screen behind her. The performances served as one of the closing songs on the set-list. Similar props and set-up were used for the following shows of the tour, with the addition on the "Fly Away (Butterfly Reprise)" addition at the show's finale.  In subsequent tours, the chorus of the song was played by the band and sung by the background vocals at the end of each concert as Carey would exit the stage.  In the Angels Advocate Tour an instrumental version was played as an introduction while Carey entered the stage. "Fly Away (Butterfly Reprise)" was put as the introduction of Carey's shows during her second concert residency placed in Las Vegas, The Butterfly Returns (2018) to match its theme.

Track listings

 Europe CD single
 "Butterfly" – 4:34
 "Fly Away" (Butterfly Reprise) – 3:49

 12" single
"Fly Away" (Butterfly Reprise) (Fly Away Club Mix) – 9:52
"Fly Away" (Butterfly Reprise) (Def 'B' Fly Mix) – 8:46 
"Fly Away" (Butterfly Reprise) – 3:49
"Butterfly" – 4:34

 UK CD single (Part 1)
 "Butterfly" – 4:34
 "Fly Away" (Butterfly Reprise) – 3:49
 "Fly Away" (Butterfly Reprise) (Fly Away Club Mix) - 9:52
 "The Roof" (Mobb Deep Remix) - 5:31

 UK CD single (Part 2)
 "Butterfly" – 4:34
 "One Sweet Day" (Live) - 5:08
 "Hero" (Spanish Version) - 4:16
 "Without You" - 3:34

 Butterfly EP
 "Fly Away" (Butterfly Reprise) (Fly Away Club Mix) – 9:51
 "Fly Away" (Butterfly Reprise) (Def "B" Fly Mix) – 8:40
 "Butterfly" (Meme Club Radio) – 4:19
 "Butterfly" (Meme's Extended Club Mix Part 1 & 2) – 8:43
 "Butterfly" (Meme Latin Beats) – 5:59
 "Butterfly" (Sambaterfly Edit) – 4:40
 "Butterfly" (Sambaterfly for Clubbers) – 8:22
 "Butterfly" (Classic Bossa Nova) – 4:12
 "Butterfly" (Meme's Instrumental) – 8:43
 "Butterfly" (Meme's Radio Instrumental) – 4:18

Remixes

David Morales Mixes
"Fly Away" (Butterfly Reprise) (Fly Away Club Mix) – 9:52
"Fly Away" (Butterfly Reprise) (Def 'B' Fly Mix) – 8:46 
DJ Meme Mixes
"Butterfly" (Meme's Extended Club Mix Part 1 & 2) – 8:40
"Butterfly" (Meme's Latin Beats) – 6:00 
DJ Grego Mixes
"Butterfly" (Sambaterfly) – 8:20
"Butterfly" (Sambaterfly Edit) – 4:35
"Butterfly" (Sambaterfly For Clubbers) – 8:20
"Butterfly" (Classic Bossa Nova) – 4:10

Credits and personnel 
Credits adapted from the Butterfly liner notes.
 Mariah Carey – songwriting, co-production, vocals
 Walter Afanasieff – songwriting, co-production

Charts

Weekly charts

Year-end charts

Release history

References

Further reading 

 
 

1990s ballads
1997 singles
Mariah Carey songs
Pop ballads
Contemporary R&B ballads
Songs written by Walter Afanasieff
Songs written by Mariah Carey
Music videos directed by Mariah Carey
Song recordings produced by Walter Afanasieff
1997 songs
Columbia Records singles
Sony Music singles
Gospel songs